Soufiane Haddi (born 2 February 1991) is a Moroccan road bicycle racer, who rides for Emirati amateur team Abu Dhabi Cycling Club. He competed at the 2012 and 2016 Summer Olympics in the Men's road race, but failed to finish either event.

Major results

2010
 8th Grand Prix of Al Fatah
2011
 9th Overall Kwita Izina Cycling Tour
2012
 2nd Challenge Khouribga, Challenge des phosphates
 Les Challenges de la Marche Verte
3rd GP Oued Eddahab
4th GP Sakia El Hamra
5th GP Al Massira
 4th Overall Tour du Maroc
1st Young rider classification
 6th Trophée de l'Anniversaire, Challenge du Prince
 10th Overall Course de la Solidarité Olympique
1st Young rider classification
2013
 1st  Time trial, National Road Championships
 1st Stage 10 Tour du Maroc
 2nd Overall La Tropicale Amissa Bongo
1st  Young rider classification
1st  Sprints classification
 3rd Trophée de la Maison Royale, Challenge du Prince
 Mediterranean Games
8th Road race
10th Time trial
2014
 1st  Time trial, National Road Championships
 1st Stage 8 Tour de Singkarak
 3rd Overall Sharjah International Cycling Tour|Sharjah Tour
1st Mountains classification
1st Stage 2
 7th Overall Jelajah Malaysia
2015
 National Road Championships
1st  Road race
1st  Time trial
 1st Overall Sharjah International Cycling Tour
1st Stages 1, 2 & 3
 2nd Overall Tour d'Egypte
1st Stage 3
 4th Overall Tour du Maroc
1st  Sprints classification
1st Stage 6
 5th Overall Jelajah Malaysia
1st Stage 2 (TTT)
2016
 National Road Championships
1st  Time trial
3rd Road race
 1st Stage 1 (TTT) Sharjah International Cycling Tour
 African Road Championships
4th Road race
4th Time trial
 4th Overall Tour de Côte d'Ivoire
1st Stage 2
 9th Overall La Tropicale Amissa Bongo
 10th Overall Dubai Tour
1st  Young rider classification
2017
 4th Time trial, National Road Championships
2019
 10th Overall Tour of Mersin

References

External links

Moroccan male cyclists
1991 births
People from Khenifra
Living people
Olympic cyclists of Morocco
Cyclists at the 2012 Summer Olympics
Cyclists at the 2016 Summer Olympics
Competitors at the 2013 Mediterranean Games
Mediterranean Games competitors for Morocco
20th-century Moroccan people
21st-century Moroccan people